National Route 49 is a national highway of Japan connecting Iwaki, Fukushima and Chūō-ku, Niigata in Japan, with a total length of 246.4 km (153.11 mi).

History
Route 49 was designated on 18 May 1953 as National Route 115, and this was redesignated as Route 49 when Route 115 was promoted to a Class 1 highway.

Route data
Length: 246.4 km (153.11 mi)
Origin: Iwaki, Fukushima
Terminus: Chūō-ku, Niigata (originates at junction with Routes 7, 8, 17, 113 and 116)
Major cities: Kōriyama, Aizuwakamatsu, Agano

Intersecting routes

in Fukushima Prefecture
Routes 4, 6, 115, 118, 121, 252, 294, 349 and 400
in Niigata Prefecture
Routes 7, 8, 290, 403, 459 and 460

References

049
Roads in Fukushima Prefecture
Roads in Niigata Prefecture